James Peter Jaffe (22 November 1913 – 20 August 1982, in Orange, California) was a British competitive sailor and Olympic medalist.

He won a silver medal in the Star class mixed two-person keelboat at the 1932 Summer Olympics in Los Angeles, at the age of 18.

Jaffe was Jewish, and was born in Richmond, in Greater London.

See also
 List of select Jews in sailing

References

1913 births
1982 deaths
Sportspeople from London
British male sailors (sport)
Sailors at the 1932 Summer Olympics – Star
Olympic sailors of Great Britain
Olympic silver medallists for Great Britain
Jewish sailors (sport)
Olympic medalists in sailing
British Jews
Medalists at the 1932 Summer Olympics